, also known as Nanno (ナンノ), is a Japanese actress and singer. She graduated from Horikoshi High School. She played Saki Asamiya in the second season of the live action Sukeban Deka TV series replacing fellow idol star Yuki Saitō. She is currently independent. She has previously worked for the S1 Company, Southern Field, Sweet Basil and K Dash Group talent agencies.

History 
While attending the private Shoin High School in Kobe, Minamino successfully passed an audition in 1982. During the summer of her second year of high school, she moved to Tokyo where she attended Horikoshi High School along with fellow entertainers Miharu Morina and Minako Honda. Minamino and Honda met when they both took the entrance examination.

Minamino made her debut television role in 1984 in Meimon Shiritsu Jōshi Kōkō. She began working for the talent agency S1 Company at this time. Despite being a mostly unknown face in Japanese entertainment, Minamino was given an unusually large number of photos in a seinen manga magazine.  
 
This led to her being cast in 1985 in the role of Saki Asamiya in the second season of Fuji TV's Sukeban Deka, a popular live action TV series about a juvenile delinquent being forced to go undercover for the police in a high school known for its rough gangs. This role made Minamino an instant star, and many phrases from this season became fashionable. She was also nominated at the 11th Annual Japan Academy Prize event as "Rookie of the Year" for her performance in the movie version released in 1987. Her "Saki Asamiya" character was used in a wide range of adverts.

She made her singing debut on 1985-06-23 with her song Hazukashi Sugite. In 1988 she played two roles, including the starring role, in the Taiga drama Takeda Shingen. That same year, she reached the number one spot for sales of publicity photo shots sold, setting a new record. Minamino was also honored by the country of Grenada when they issued postage stamps featuring two different head shots.

In 1989, Minamino switched talent agencies, moving from S1 Company to the private Southern Field agency. In the 1992 film Kantsubaki, she made her first nude appearance, closely followed by her second in Watashi o Daite, Soshite Kiss-shite that same year. Minamino was nominated for the 16th Annual Japan Academy Prize for "Outstanding Performance by an Actress in a Leading Role" (basically "Best Actress") for her performances in both of these films.

Minamino has appeared in interviews and photo shoots in Shueisha's Weekly Playboy magazine since 1984. In the 1989-08-01 issue, she appeared on the cover.

Filmography

Television

Series

One-shot dramas

Discography

Singles 
Singles marked with "※" reached No. 1 on Oricon chart.

Sources:

Albums 
The majority of albums released after 1991 are "Best of" albums.

Sources:

Commercial tie-ins 
Minamino has performed the theme songs for multiple television series and movies, and her music has been used in many commercials. Following is a list of some of them.

Video 
 Tokimeki, Kudasai (1986-06-21)
 First Concert (1986-11-01)
 Nanno Club (1987-07-22)
 Summer Concert (1987-11-21)
 From Summer Concert (1987-11-21)
 Colorful Ave. (1988-08-01)
 Etu du Cinema Yoko Minamino Summer Concert '88 (1988-12-21)
 Omoi no Mama ni: Yoko Minamino Summer Concert '89 (1989-11-22)
 Just Sweet Love (1989-11-24, promo item never offered for sale)
 Abend (1990-11-21)
 Toki no Nagare ni: The Last Day of Tour 1991 in Sunplaza Hall by Yoko Minamino (1991-11-21)
 Dear My Best (1992-11-21)
 Nanno DVD Box (2005-09-28, complete compilation of her performances in movies)

Books

Photo 
  (April 1986, Kodansha, Photographer: Seiichi Nomura)
  (September 1986, Hakusensha, Photographer: Ryū Ōmatsu)
  (1987, Bandai Visual)
  (November 1988, Wani Books, Photographer: Seiichi Nomura)
 My Dear (January 1991, CBS-Sony Shuppan, Photographers: Seiichi Nomura, et al.)
 Great (April 1991, Kodansha, Photographers: Hajime Sawatari, et al.)
 Flowers (October 2004, Shueisha, Photographer: Yorihito Yamauchi)

Other 
  (September 1989, Kadokawa Shoten)

Awards

References

External links 
 Official agency profile 
 
 

1967 births
Living people
Horikoshi High School alumni
Actors from Hyōgo Prefecture
Japanese actresses
Japanese idols
Japanese television personalities
Japanese women pop singers
Musicians from Hyōgo Prefecture